Mitinskaya is a rural locality (a village) in Nizhneslobodskoye Rural Settlement, Vozhegodsky District, Vologda Oblast, Russia. The population was 19 as of 2002.

Geography 
The distance to Vozhega is 56.5 km, to Derevenka is 7.5 km. Guryevskaya, Zaozerye, Karpovskaya are the nearest rural localities.

References 

Rural localities in Vozhegodsky District